Timothy (Phleum pratense) is an abundant perennial grass native to most of Europe except for the Mediterranean region. It is also known as timothy-grass,  meadow cat's-tail or common cat's tail. It is a member of the genus Phleum, consisting of about 15 species of annual and perennial grasses.

It is probably named after Timothy Hanson, an American farmer and agriculturalist said to have introduced it from New England to the southern states in the early 18th century. Upon his recommendation it became a major source of hay and cattle fodder to British farmers in the mid-18th century.

Timothy can be confused with meadow foxtail (Alopecurus pratensis) or purple-stem cat's-tail (Phleum phleoides).

Description
The leaves are hairless, rolled rather than folded, and the lower sheaths turn dark brown.

It has no stolons or rhizomes, and no auricles.

It flowers from June until September. The stamen are pink.

The ligule is short and blunt.

It grows well in heavy soil, and is noted for its resistance to cold and drought, and thus ability to grow in dry upland or poor sandy soils. In pasture it tends to be overwhelmed by more competitive grasses. After cutting it grows slowly.

Subspecies
There are two subspecies:

 Phleum pratense subsp. pratense. Widespread. Native to the Mediterranean.
 Phleum pratense subsp. bertolonii. Calcareous grassland.

Cultivation and uses 

Timothy was unintentionally introduced to North America by early settlers, and was first described in 1711 by John Hurd from plants growing in New Hampshire. Hurd named the grass "hurd grass" but a farmer named Timothy Hanson began to promote cultivation of it as a hay about 1720, and the grass has been known by its present name since then. Timothy has now become naturalized throughout most of the US and Canada.
 
It is commonly grown for cattle feed and, in particular, as hay for horses. It is relatively high in fibre, especially when cut late. It is considered a harsh, coarse grass little relished by livestock if cut earlier. It is considered part of the standard mix for grass hay and provides quality nutrition for horses. Timothy hay is a staple food for domestic pet rabbits, guinea pigs, chinchillas, and degus, often making up the bulk of their diet. Timothy hay is rich in long fibre and its abrasive texture helps to grind down the teeth, keeping both the teeth and jaw in good order.

Some caterpillars use it as a food plant, e.g. the Essex skipper (Thymelicus lineola) and the marbled white (Melanargia galathea). It also grows in roadsides and abandoned fields but generally requires nutrient-rich soils.

Its pollen is a common allergen; it has recently been used in small amounts as part of a new hay fever vaccine Grazax, which is designed to recondition the body's immune system so it no longer responds to pollen.

Plants persist through the winter. Dead, straw-colored flowering stems may persist, but only for a short time, and are recognized by the distinctive spike-like inflorescence.

Breeding objectives in timothy 
Nowadays, most breeding programs for forage grasses and especially timothy have been focusing on the improvement of dry matter yield, resistance to disease, dry matter digestibility, and nutritional value, which depends on target species and environment. Due to high phenotypic and genetic heterogeneity in individual plants, and the polyploidy of many species, breeding programs for timothy is accompanied by some difficulties.

Confusion with other species
It is often confused with meadow foxtail (Alopecurus pratensis). Timothy flowers later, from June until August, whereas meadow foxtail flowers from April until June. The spikelets of timothy are twin hornlike projections arranged in cylindrical panicles, whereas foxtail has a soft, single awn. 

Purple-stem cat's-tail (Phleum phleoides) prefers lighter soils and grows on chalk downland.

Mountain timothy (Phleum alpinum) grows above . A "wild Timothy" was found to grow in Yosemite at the time of its discovery but may have been a foxtail.

Timothy canary grass (Phalaris angusta), another species with a similar cylindrical panicle, is toxic to livestock.

References

External links

 Flora Europaea: Phleum pratense
 Timothy - US Department of Agriculture

Pooideae
Bunchgrasses of Europe
Flora of Eastern Europe
Flora of Central Europe
Flora of Northern Europe
Flora of Estonia
Forages
Medicinal plants of Europe
Plants described in 1753